Polyipnus matsubarai is a species of ray-finned fish in the genus Polyipnus. Its standard length is 9.7 cm and lives at a depth of 240 metres. They inhabit the waters around Japan, the Philippine Sea, and Hawaiian-Emperor Seamounts.

References

Sternoptychidae
Fish described in 1961
Taxa named by Leonard Peter Schultz
Fish of the Pacific Ocean